Novosphingobium panipatense  is a Gram-negative and halophilic bacterium from the genus Novosphingobium which has been isolated from oil-contaminated soil in Panipat in India.

References

External links
Type strain of Novosphingobium panipatense at BacDive -  the Bacterial Diversity Metadatabase	

Bacteria described in 2009
Sphingomonadales
Halophiles